Park Yong-ho (born March 25, 1981) is a retired South Korean football player who played as a central defender.

He was part of the South Korea football team in 2004 Summer Olympics, who finished second in Group A, making it through to the next round, before being defeated by silver medal winners Paraguay.

Honors

Club 
FC Seoul
K League
Winners (1): 2000, 2010
League Cup
Winners (1): 2010

References

External links
 
 Park Yong-ho – National Team Stats at KFA 
 
 

1981 births
Living people
Sportspeople from Incheon
Association football defenders
South Korean footballers
South Korea under-20 international footballers
South Korea under-23 international footballers
South Korea international footballers
FC Seoul players
Gimcheon Sangmu FC players
Busan IPark players
Gangwon FC players
K League 1 players
K League 2 players
2001 FIFA Confederations Cup players
Footballers at the 2004 Summer Olympics
Olympic footballers of South Korea
Expatriate footballers in Malaysia
Asian Games medalists in football
Footballers at the 2002 Asian Games
Asian Games bronze medalists for South Korea
Medalists at the 2002 Asian Games
FC Seoul non-playing staff
Association football scouts